Stryd-y-Facsen is a hamlet in the community of Llanfachraeth, Ynys Môn, Wales, which is 139.2 miles (224 km) from Cardiff and 223.1 miles (359.1 km) from London.

References

See also 
 List of localities in Wales by population

Villages in Anglesey